Sheikh Rajab Ali  was a Parachinar Pakistan Shia Muslim religious leader, Imam Mosque, Teacher born in Gilgit region. He was succeeded by Sheikh Ali Madad. He established an Islamic School (Madrassah) for Parachinar People in 1968.

See also
 Sheikh Ali Madad
 Muhammad Nawaz Irfani
 Arif Hussain Hussaini
 Sheikh Fida Hussain Muzahiri

Anti-Americanism
Deaths from stomach cancer
Pakistani exiles
Pakistani religious leaders
Shia scholars of Islam
People from Gilgit
Pakistani Shia clerics
Date of death missing